Henry Box (September 1837 – 3 June 1916) was an Australian cricketer. He played two first-class cricket matches for Victoria in 1858.

See also
 List of Victoria first-class cricketers

References

1837 births
1916 deaths
Australian cricketers
Victoria cricketers
Cricketers from Greater London
Melbourne Cricket Club cricketers